The 1940 Lima earthquake occurred on May 24 at 11:35 a.m. PST with a magnitude of 8.2 on the moment magnitude scale. Shaking from this powerful earthquake was felt throughout the country, and in Ecuador and Chile. An estimated 179 to 300 Peruvians lost their lives while 3,500 left injured by the earthquake. A tsunami of up to two meters was generated without major damage.

Earthquake 
The earthquake was a megathrust event, caused by a sudden slippage along a section of fault under the Peru–Chile Trench. Here, the Nazca Plate subducts beneath the South American Plate at a rate of /yr, this process could be seen throughout the entire west coast of South America. The interface where both plates make contact occasionally produce moderate to great earthquakes. The rupture area is wedged between that of the 1966 and 1974 earthquake.

Damage 
In Lima, the devastation was great, 32 people were killed in this city alone, while in Callao, the death toll was at 58. The Lima Cathedral was badly damaged, together with several thousand buildings. At Bellavista, there were 11 deaths, ten of them were children when the school they were in collapsed, and in San Miguel, two were dead. An estimated 3.6 million Peruvian sols worth of damage was caused by the earthquake. The earthquake was felt with a maximum Modified Mercalli intensity of VIII (Severe).

See also 
 List of earthquakes in Peru
List of earthquakes in 1940

References

External links 

 LIMA EARTHQUAKE - NO SOUND from AP Archives
 Earthquake In Peru (1940) from British Pathé

1940 earthquakes
Earthquakes in Peru
Megathrust earthquakes in Peru
1940 natural disasters
1940 in Peru
1940 in South America
May 1940 events
1940 disasters in Peru